The Calamus Creek Bridge near Maxwell, Iowa is a concrete Luten arch bridge constructed in 1905. It was built by N. M. Stark and Company for a cost of $900.

In 1998 the Calamus Creek Bridge was listed on the National Register of Historic Places (NRHP), on of several N. M. Stark Luten bridges on the register.

The NRHP nomination for the bridge says:

References

Road bridges on the National Register of Historic Places in Iowa
Bridges completed in 1905
National Register of Historic Places in Story County, Iowa
Arch bridges in Iowa
Bridges in Story County, Iowa
Concrete bridges in the United States
1905 establishments in Iowa